Houyi is a station on the Red line of Kaohsiung MRT in Sanmin District, Kaohsiung, Taiwan. The character 驛 (Chinese:yì, Japanese: えき, eki) means "station" in Japanese; the station name literally means "(Kaohsiung) rear station".

Station overview

The station is a two-level, underground station with an island platform and four exits. It is 193 metres long and is located at the intersection of Bo-ai 1st Rd. and Chahaer St.

Around the station
 Kaohsiung Medical University
 Sanmin Park
 Tower of Light

References

External links
KRTC Houyi Station

2008 establishments in Taiwan
Kaohsiung Metro Red line stations
Railway stations opened in 2008